The following Union Army units and commanders fought in the Battle of Hatcher's Run (February 5-7, 1865) during the Petersburg campaign of the American Civil War. Order of battle is compiled from the official tabulation of casualties and includes only units which sustained casualties.

Abbreviations used

Military rank
 MG = Major General
 BG = Brigadier General
 Col = Colonel
 Ltc = Lieutenant Colonel
 Maj = Major
 Cpt = Captain

Other
 w = wounded
 m = mortally wounded
 k = killed
 c = captured

Army of the Potomac

II Corps

MG Andrew A. Humphreys

V Corps

MG Gouverneur K. Warren

Escort: 4th Pennsylvania Cavalry, Company C
Provost Guard: 104th New York

VI Corps

Cavalry

References

American Civil War orders of battle